Mōkōlea Rock is an islet in Kailua Bay along the windward coast of Oahu in Hawaii and located east of Marine Corps Base Hawaii (MCBH).  Like most of the small islets off the coastline of a major island in the Hawaiian Islands, Mōkōlea is a State Bird Sanctuary containing many types of birds. Access to the islet requires a permit, and is only allowed to people involved in protecting the islet's fauna. The islet is more commonly known to local residents as "Birdshit Island", "Birdshit", or simply "Bird" because its black lava rock surface is heavily coated with bird droppings. 
 
All three consist of barren, jagged lava. Mokolea is part of the windward rim of the Kawainui volcanic caldera. The shelf is a moderately interesting spot for scuba diving, although much of the time the area is rough, and anchoring a boat is difficult.

Mokolea has been described as a shore dive by some, but it should not be attempted from the shore due to strong currents and the distance between the dive spot and Kailua Beach.

See also 

 Honolulu Volcanics

References 

Islands of Hawaii
Geography of Honolulu County, Hawaii